Neyzar-e Olya (also Romanized as Neyzār-e ‘Olyā; also known as Naz̧ār-e Bālā, Nozzār-e Bālā, Nozzār-e ‘Olyā, and Yanzār-e ‘Olyā) is a village in Abdoliyeh-ye Gharbi Rural District, in the Central District of Ramshir County, Khuzestan Province, Iran. At the 2006 census, its population was 35, in 6 families.

References 

Populated places in Ramshir County